Governor Roosevelt may refer to:

Theodore Roosevelt, 33rd Governor of New York from January 1, 1899 to December 31, 1900
Theodore Roosevelt Jr., Governor General of the Philippines from February 29, 1932 to July 15, 1933
Franklin D. Roosevelt, 44th Governor of New York from January 1, 1929 to December 31, 1932